Stanley Jones (24 March 1888 – 9 March 1962) was a British cyclist. He competed in two events at the 1912 Summer Olympics.

References

External links
 

1888 births
1962 deaths
English male cyclists
Olympic cyclists of Great Britain
Cyclists at the 1912 Summer Olympics
Cyclists from Greater London